is a Japanese actor and singer represented by Avex Management. He is best known for his role as Italy in the musicals Hetalia, and Edogawa Ranpo in the stage plays Bungo Stray Dogs.

Filmography

Television
 Tensai TV-kun MAX (2009–2012) – TV Warrior
 2.5D NAVI (2019 – ) – Regular appearance
 Sengoku Nabe TV (2020) – Mori Nagatakashi
 Tsukai TV Sukatto Japan (2020) – Yamaji Tsuyoshi
 Osanai Brothers (2020) – Shirafuji Katsuki

Stage Play
 Legend of the Galactic Heroes – Julian Mintz
 Legend of the Galactic Heroes – Chapter Three – Civil War (2013)
 Legend of the Galactic Heroes – Chapter Four Part One – Crash Eve (2014)
 Legend of the Galactic Heroes – Special Performance – Star Trail (2015)
 Satomi Hakkenden (2014) – Fusahachi
 Hetalia – Italy
 Hetalia – Singin’ in the World (2015) 
 Hetalia- The Great World (2016) 
 Hetalia – In the New World (2017) 
 Psycome; Stage (2016) – Kamiya Kyosuke
 Masuda Kosuke Theater “Good Day for Gag Manga” Deluxe Flavor (2016) – Ono no Imoko
 Geten no Hana Yume Akari (2016) – Takenaka Hanbei
 Ace Attorney Investigations (2016) – Takanashi Mamoru
 Whistle! BREAK THROUGH – Break through the wall (2016) – Toyama Ippei
 Gokujo Bungaku “Human Chair/The conjurer” (2016) – Fumiyo
 Stage play “Messiah Project” – Miike Mayo
 Messiah – Akatsuki no Toki (2017)
 Messiah – Yuukyuu no Toki (2017)
 Messiah – Tsukuyomi no Toki (2018)
 Messiah – Twilight – Kokon no Arano (2019)
 Messiah – Reimei no Toki (2019)
 Stage play MONSTER LIVE! (2017)
 Stage play “King of Prism” – Kogami Taiga
 KING OF PRISM – Over the Sunshine! (2017) 
 KING OF PRISM – Shiny Rose Stars (2020) 
 Bungo Stray Dogs – Edogawa Ranpo
 Bungo Stray Dogs (2018) 
 Bungo Stray Dogs – Kuro no Jidai (2018) 
 Bungo Stray Dogs – Sansha Teiritsu (2019)
 Bungo Stray Dogs – Hajigaki Tanteisha Setsuritsu Hiwa (2020) 
 Stage play “Hiragana Danshi” (2018) – Ne
 Musical “Mata kanarazu aou – to daremo ga itta” (2018) – Akitsuki Kazuya
 Stage play “Tougenkyou Labyrinth” (2019) – Sakata Ginga
 Theatrical Company Animeza – Butai no kodo ha ai – (2019) – Tatsuma
 Musical “Indigo Tomato” (2019) – Mamoru
 Tensai TV-kun the STAGE – TV Warrior REBORN (2020) – Nagae Ryoki
 Stage play “RE:CLAIM” (2020) – Hatori (Performances cancelled due COVID-19)
 Stage play “12 Angry men” (2020) – Jury No.1
 Musical "Houshin engi – Kaisen no Prelude" (2020) – Inkō
 Reading Drama "5 years after" (2020)
 Musical “DREAM!ing” (2020) – Shishimaru Takatomi
 Stage play "Aoyama Operetta" (2021) – Miyajima Asahi
 Reading Drama "5 years after"

Movies
 Messiah Project Gaiden – Kyokuya Polar night (2017) – Miike Mayo
 Togenkyo Labyrinth (2019) – Sakata Ginga

Live Concerts
 Club INSPIRE VJ Gou Presents Event (2016, 2017)
 Live “STAGE FES” –Stage play “KING OF PRISM” – Kogami Taiga
 STAGE FES 2017
 STAGE FES 2018
 STAGE FES 2019
 Musical “Hetalia FINAL LIVE – A World in the Universe -” (2018) – Italy
Stage play “KING OF PRISM – Rose Party on STAGE 2019” (2019) – Kogami Taiga

WEB shows
 Don't you work part-time? Tenju-kun (2019) – Shirafuji Katsuki
 peep “Nurarihyon no sumu ie” (2020) – Oyamada Kazuhiro

References

External links
Nagae Ryoki on Avex Management web
長江 崚行(@Ryoki_N0826) on Twitter
長江崚行(ryoki_n0826) on Instagram
Nagae Ryoki's Official Blog "RYO-KI BLOG"

1998 births
Living people
21st-century Japanese male actors